Ottoland is a village in the Dutch province of South Holland. It is a part of the municipality of Molenlanden, and lies about 15 km northwest of Gorinchem.

In 2001, the village of Ottoland had 173 inhabitants. The built-up area of the village was 0.022 km², and contained 57 residences.
The statistical area "Ottoland", which also can include the peripheral parts of the village, as well as the surrounding countryside, has a population of around 490.

Ottoland was a separate municipality between 1817 and 1986, until it became part of Graafstroom. Last one has made part of Molenwaard since 2013. Until the 1980s Ottoland had only two streets, simply called A and B.

See also
Laagblokland

References

Former municipalities of South Holland
Populated places in South Holland
Molenlanden